Donald Lawrence Keene (June 18, 1922 – February 24, 2019) was an American-born Japanese scholar, historian, teacher, writer and translator of Japanese literature. Keene was University Professor emeritus and Shincho Professor Emeritus of Japanese Literature at Columbia University, where he taught for over fifty years. Soon after the 2011 Tōhoku earthquake and tsunami, he retired from Columbia, moved to Japan permanently, and acquired citizenship under the name . This was also his poetic  and occasional nickname, spelled in the ateji form .

Early life and education
Keene was born in 1922 in the Flatbush section of Brooklyn, New York City and attended James Madison High School. He received a Bachelor's degree from Columbia University in 1942 and studied under Mark Van Doren, Moses Hadas, Lionel Trilling, and Jacques Barzun. He then studied the Japanese language at the United States Navy Japanese Language School in Boulder, Colorado and in Berkeley, California, and served as an intelligence officer in the Pacific region during World War II. Upon his discharge from the US Navy, he returned to Columbia where he earned a master's degree in 1947.

Keene studied for a year at Harvard University before transferring to Cambridge University as a Henry Fellow, where he earned a second master's and became a Fellow of Corpus Christi College, Cambridge from 1948 to 1954, and a University Lecturer from 1949 to 1955. In the interim, in 1953, he also studied at Kyoto University, and earned a PhD from Columbia in 1949. Keene credits Ryūsaku Tsunoda as a mentor during this period.

While studying in the East Asian library at Columbia in 1941, a man whom Keene did not know invited him to dinner at the Chinese restaurant where Keene and Lee, a Chinese-American Columbia graduate student, ate every day. The man's name was Jack Kerr, and he had lived in Japan for several years and taught English in Taiwan. Kerr invited Keene to study Japanese in the summer from a student he taught in Taiwan, for Kerr to have competition when learning Japanese. Their tutor was Inomata Tadashi, and they were taught elementary spoken Japanese and kanji.

While staying at Cambridge, Keene went to meet Arthur Waley who was best known for his translation work in classical Chinese and Japanese literature. For Keene, Waley's translation of Chinese and Japanese literature was inspiring, even arousing in Keene the thought of becoming a second Waley.

Career
Keene was a Japanologist who published about 25 books in English on Japanese topics, including both studies of Japanese literature and culture and translations of Japanese classical and modern literature, including a four-volume history of Japanese literature which has become a standard work. Keene also published about 30 books in Japanese, some of which have been translated from English. He was president of the Donald Keene Foundation for Japanese Culture.

Keene was awarded the Order of Culture by the Japanese government in 2008, one of the highest honors bestowed by the Imperial Family in the country, becoming the first non-Japanese to receive the award. Soon after the 2011 Tōhoku earthquake and tsunami, Keene retired from Columbia and moved to Japan with the intention of living out the remainder of his life there. He acquired Japanese citizenship, adopting the legal name . This required him to relinquish his American citizenship, as Japan does not permit dual citizenship.

Keene was well known and respected in Japan and his relocation there following the earthquake was widely lauded.

Personal life
In 2013 Keene adopted shamisen player Seiki Uehara as a son. Keene was not married.

Keene died of cardiac arrest in Tokyo on February 24, 2019, aged 96.

Selected works
In an overview of writings by and about Keene, OCLC/WorldCat lists roughly 600+ works in 1,400+ publications in 16 languages and 39,000+ library holdings. 
These lists are not finished; you can help Wikipedia by adding to them.

Works in English

Works in Japanese

Translations 
 Chikamatsu Monzaemon, The Battles of Coxinga: Chikamatsu's Puppet Play, Its Background and Importance (Taylor's Foreign Pr, 1951)
 Dazai Osamu, No Longer Human (New Directions, 1958)
 Chikamatsu Monzaemon, The Major Plays of Chikamatsu (Columbia University Press, June 1, 1961)
Includes critical commentary
 Yoshida Kenkō, Essays in Idleness: The Tsurezuregusa of Kenko (Columbia University Press, June 1, 1967)
 Mishima Yukio, Five Modern Noh Plays – Including: Madame de Sade (Tuttle, 1967)
 Chushingura: The Treasury of Loyal Retainers, a Puppet Play (Columbia University Press, April 1, 1971)
 Mishima Yukio, After the Banquet (Random House Inc, January 1, 1973)
 Abe Kobo The man who turned into a stick: three related plays (Columbia University Press, 1975). Original text published by Tokyo University Press.
 Dazai Osamu, The Setting Sun (Tuttle, 1981)
 ??, The tale of the shining Princess (Metropolitan Museum of Art and Viking Press, 1981)
 Abe Kobo, Friends: a play (Tuttle, 1986)
 Abe Kobo, Three Plays (Columbia University Press, February 1, 1997)
 Matsuo Bashō, The Narrow Road to Oku (Kodansha Amer Inc, April 1, 1997)
 Kawabata Yasunari, The Tale of the Bamboo Cutter (Kodansha Amer Inc, September 1, 1998)
 Yamamoto Yuzo, One Hundred Sacks of Rice: A Stage Play (Nagaoka City Kome Hyappyo Foundation, 1998)
 Miyata Masayuki (illustrations), Donald Keene (essay), H. Mack Horton [En trans], 源氏物語 – The Tale of Genji (Kodansha International, 2001). Bilingual illustrated text with essay.
 Donald Keene & Oda Makoto, The Breaking Jewel, Keene, Donald (trans) (Columbia University Press, March 1, 2003)

Editor
 Anthology of Japanese Literature from the Earliest Era to the Mid-Nineteenth Century (Grove Pr, March 1, 1960)
 The Old Woman, the Wife, and the Archer: Three Modern Japanese Short Novels (Viking Press, 1961)
 Anthology of Chinese Literature: From the 14th Century to the Present Day (co-editor with Cyril Birch) (Grove Pr, June 1, 1987)
 Love Songs from the Man'Yoshu (Kodansha Amer Inc, August 1, 2000)
 Modern Japanese Literature from 1868 to the Present Day (Grove Pr, January 31, 1994)

Honorary degrees
Keene was awarded various honorary doctorates, from:
 University of Cambridge (1978)
 St. Andrews Presbyterian College (North Carolina, 1990)
 Middlebury College (Vermont, 1995)
 Columbia University (New York, 1997)
 Tohoku University (Sendai, 1997)
 Waseda University (Tokyo, 1998)
 Tokyo University of Foreign Studies (Tokyo, 1999)
 Keiwa College (Niigata, 2000)
 Kyoto Sangyo University (Kyoto, 2002)
 Kyorin University (Tokyo, 2007)
 Toyo University (Tokyo, 2011)
 Japan Women's University (Tokyo, 2012)
 Nishogakusha University (Kyoto, 2012)
 Doshisha University (Kyoto, 2013)

Awards and commendations
 Guggenheim Fellowship, 1961
 Kikuchi Kan Prize (Kikuchi Kan Shō Society for the Advancement of Japanese Culture), 1962.
 Van Ameringen Distinguished Book Award, 1967
 Kokusai Shuppan Bunka Shō Taishō, 1969
 Kokusai Shuppan Bunka Shō, 1971 
 Yamagata Banto Prize (Yamagata Bantō Shō), 1983
 The Japan Foundation Award (Kokusai Kōryū Kikin Shō), 1983
 Yomiuri Literary Prize (Yomiuri Bungaku Shō), 1985 (Keene was the first non-Japanese to receive this prize, for a book of literary criticism (Travellers of a Hundred Ages) in Japanese)
 Award for Excellence (Graduate Faculties Alumni of Columbia University), 1985
 Nihon Bungaku Taishō, 1985
 Donald Keene Center of Japanese Culture at Columbia University named in Keene's honour, 1986
 Tōkyō-to Bunka Shō, 1987
 NBCC (The National Book Critics Circle) Ivan Sandrof Award for Lifetime Achievement in Publishing, 1990
 The Fukuoka Asian Culture Prize (Fukuoka Ajia Bunka Shō), 1991
 Nihon Hōsō Kyōkai (NHK) Hōsō Bunka Shō, 1993
 Inoue Yasushi Bunka Shō (Inoue Yasushi Kinen Bunka Zaidan), 1995
 The Distinguished Achievement Award (from The Tokyo American Club) (for the lifetime achievements and unique contribution to international relations), 1995
 Award of Honor (from The Japan Society of Northern California), 1996
 Asahi Prize, 1997
 Mainichi Shuppan Bunka Shō (The Mainichi Newspapers), 2002
 The PEN/Ralph Manheim Medal for Translation, 2003
 Ango Award (from Niigata, Niigata), 2010

National honors and decorations

Decorations
 (Order of the Rising Sun, Gold Rays with Neck Ribbon, Third Class, 1975)
 (Order of the Rising Sun, Gold and Silver Star, Second Class, 1993)
 (Order of Culture (Bunka kunshō), 2008)

Honors
 Person of Cultural Merit (Bunka Kōrōsha) (Japanese Government), 2002 (Keene was the third non-Japanese person to be designated "an individual of distinguished cultural service" by the Japanese government)
 Freedom of (meiyo kumin) Kita ward, Tokyo, 2006

Notes

References

External links
 Donald Keene Center of Japanese Culture 

1922 births
2019 deaths
Military personnel from New York City
Writers from New York City
Columbia College (New York) alumni
Columbia University faculty
Harvard University alumni
Alumni of Corpus Christi College, Cambridge
Fellows of Corpus Christi College, Cambridge
American emigrants to Japan
American Japanologists

Japanese–English translators
Japanese literature academics

Members of the American Academy of Arts and Letters
Naturalized citizens of Japan
Former United States citizens
American translators
Recipients of the Order of the Rising Sun, 2nd class
Recipients of the Order of Culture
Yukio Mishima
20th-century Japanese male writers
20th-century translators
United States Navy personnel of World War II
United States Navy officers
James Madison High School (Brooklyn) alumni